The Banu Daws was one of the clan of Arabia during Muhammad's era. Located south of Mecca, it is a branch of the Zahran tribe, among its leaders 
Tufayl ibn Amr, one of Muhammad's companions.

There are Islamic prophecies with regards to 'End-Times' that have quoted the tribe; like the following by Abu Hurairah:Abu Hurairah said, I heard the Prophet say, The Hour will not come until the buttocks of the women of Daws move (quiver) while going around Dhu l-Khalasah. Dhu l-Khalasah was an idol worshiped by the tribe of Daws during the Jahiliyyah. (Hadith from Bukhari.)

People
Tufayl ibn Amr — Chief
Abu Hurairah

See also
Islam

References

External links
https://web.archive.org/web/20060420204346/http://www.barn-i-islam.dk/Profeten%20Muhammad%20%28saws%29.htm

Azd
Tribes of Arabia